John of Greenford was a medieval Bishop of Chichester.

Life

Some historians say John's ancestry is unknown, but others say he was the son of a canon, or priest. Although Greenford is a location in Middlesex, no contemporary record gives him that name, and it not known when the surname was first attached to John. He was a prebend of London, and Dean of Chichester, holding the office of dean for over 20 years. He was elected to the see of Chichester in late April 1173, and consecrated on 6 October 1174. As he is said to have been the son of a priest, he obtained a papal dispensation in the summer of 1174. He died on 26 April 1180. Besides his profession of obedience to the Archbishop of Canterbury, another 13 documents of John's survive.

Citations

References

Further reading

 

1180 deaths
Bishops of Chichester
12th-century English Roman Catholic bishops
Year of birth unknown